Hispidoberyx ambagiosus, the bristlyskin, is a species of spiny-scale pricklefish found in the Indian and Pacific Oceans at depths from .  This species grows to  standard length.  This species is the only known member of its family.

References
 
 

Stephanoberyciformes
Monotypic fish genera
Fish described in 1981